The Master Thriller Series was a series of British pulp magazines that reprinted American pulp fiction in various genres.  It was published by The World's Work, starting in July 1933, and lasted till the end of 1939.  Authors who appeared in its pages included Somerset Maugham and Algernon Blackwood.

Publishing history and contents 
The first issue, titled Tales of the Foreign Legion, appeared in July 1933, and was followed at approximately quarterly intervals by issues each of which were focused on a particular type of story, such as horror, mystery, or sea stories.  The publisher, The World's Work, was a subsidiary of the American publisher Doubleday, and initially many of the reprints were from magazines published in the US by Doubleday or Dell.  In early 1939, after 24 issues, it switched to monthly publication, and this lasted until the end of the year.  The final issue, titled Tales of Ghosts and Haunted Houses, appeared in December 1939.

The quality was high to start with, but declined, with well-known names such as Somerset Maugham, Algernon Blackwood, and P.C. Wren appearing early in the series, and less prestigious authors in the later titles.  British reprints also began to appear, and there were a few original stories as well as the reprints.  Some of the titles, such as Tales of the Uncanny and Tales of the Jungle, were popular enough for a second issue under the same title to re-appear.  The most popular was Tales of the Foreign Legion, which saw five issues.

The World's Work produced several other magazines that were associated with The Master Thriller Series, but not part of it, including Fireside Ghost Stories, Ghosts and Goblins, and Mystery and Detection, a series that followed #4 in The Master Thriller series, Tales of Mystery and Detection.  Tales of Wonder, was once thought by bibliographers to be part of The Master Thriller Series but it is now known to have been a separate series from the outset.

Mike Ashley, a magazine historian, describes the quality of the stories as "variable, but the variety of themes makes the overall package of greater value than individual issues".

Bibliographic details 
There were 32 issues of The Master Thriller Series.  The publisher was The World's Work, and the editor was H. Norman Evans.  All issues were in pulp format and priced at 1/-; all were 128 pages except for the final issue, which was 96 pages.

The titles of the individual issues were as follows.

 Tales of the Foreign Legion
 Tales of the North-West Mounted Police
 Tales of the Seven Seas
 Tales of Mystery and Detection
 Tales of the Foreign Legion #2
 Tales of the Uncanny
 Tales of African Adventure
 Tales of the Orient
 Tales of the Jungle 
 Tales of the Foreign Legion #3
 Tales of the Sea
 Tales of Valour
 Tales of the Levant
 Tales of the Air 
 Tales of the Foreign Legion #4
 Tales of Adventure
 Tales of Terror
 Tales of East and West
 Tales of the Underworld
 Tales of the Uncanny #2
 Tales of Crime and Punishment
 Tales of the Grand Express
 Tales of the North-West Mounted Police #2
 Tales of Outlawry
 Tales of the Grand Dominion
 Tales of the Far Frontier
 Tales of the Underworld #2
 The Far-Flung Coasts of Crime
 Tales of the Foreign Legion #5
 Tales of the Jungle #2
 Tales of Gangsters and 'G'-Men
 Tales of Ghosts and Haunted Houses

References

Sources 
 

Defunct literary magazines published in the United Kingdom
Magazines established in 1933
Magazines disestablished in 1939
Pulp magazines